The 1982 Tartan Bitter/Daily Record Scottish Professional Championship was a professional non-ranking snooker tournament, which took place in March 1982 in Dunfermline, Scotland.

Eddie Sinclair won the title by beating Ian Black 11–7 in the final.

Main draw

References

Scottish Professional Championship
Scottish Professional Championship
Scottish Professional Championship
Scottish Professional Championship
Sport in Fife